In Mandaeism, mambuha, sometimes spelled mambuga, is sacramental drinking water used in rituals such as the masbuta (baptism).

The mambuha can be served in a kapta, a shallow brass drinking bowl that is 11 inches or less in perimeter, or in a qanina (glass bottle).

Traditionally, mambuha is taken directly from the yardna (river, i.e. the Euphrates, Tigris, or Karun rivers), but the Mandaean diaspora often uses treated tap water.

Prayers
Various prayers in the Qolasta, including prayers 33, 44, 45, 60, and 82, are recited during the drinking of the mambuha.

See also
Halalta
Holy water
Holy water in Eastern Christianity

References

Mandaean ceremonial food and drink
Water and religion
Mandaic words and phrases